Pamela Silva (born August 16, 1981) is a Peruvian-American six time Emmy award winning journalist and co-anchor of the Univision Network's weekday newsmagazine, "Primer Impacto" in Miami. (First Impact) one of the highest rating programs in the United States and in 12 Latin-American countries.
Since she joined the show in 2011, she has covered major national and international news stories; most recently, she reported on every angle of the terrorist attack at the Boston marathon, live from Boston.

Professional career
Silva began her career at Univision in 2003 as a public affairs coordinator and producer for the community affairs show "Miami Ahora" (Miami Now) at WLTV 23. She also worked as a guest reporter for Univision Network shows, "El Gordo y La Flaca" (The Fat man and The Skinny woman), "Despierta America" (Wake-Up America) and "Control."; as the Miami-based reporter for TeleFutura's "Escandalo TV" (ShowBiz TV) and as the station spokesperson for WAMI TeleFutura 69. Silva Conde was also the host of TeleFutura 69's first local newscast, "Noticias en Noventa" (News in 90), a 90-second daily segment that brought viewers highlights of local news. She was a professional cheerleader for the Miami Dolphins.

In 2005, Silva rejoined the Univision Miami affiliate news team as an entertainment anchor and reporter, soon became a substitute news anchor and was later named main anchor for the leading Spanish-language morning newscast in South Florida "Noticias 23 Al Amanecer" where she presented the news on a daily basis both WLTV Univision 23 and WAMI TeleFutura 69.  Aside from her duties as a news anchor she also worked on special feature and investigative reports as a national correspondent for the investigative newsmagazine "Aqui y Ahora" with which she continues collaborating.

Recognition
In 2006 she won her first Emmy award for on-camera work, and in 2007 she received three additional Emmy awards for writing, news feature story, and human interest story.  Two more Emmys followed: in 2009, for a feature story about Facebook, and in 2010 for Feature News Report.  In addition, she was recognized as a Distinguished Alumni from the School of Journalism and Mass Communications by the Florida International University Alumni Association at Florida International University.  In 2010 Silva won an Emmy award for Feature News Report. In 2013, she was chosen as one of People en Español's 50 most beautiful people. In May 2013 she was invited to co-host ABC Network's morning weekday talkshow The View. She was presented with the Leading Ladies of Entertainment accolade by the Latin Recording Academy in 2018.

Education
Silva graduated with honors from Florida International University with a degree in Broadcast Journalism and earned a graduate certificate in Bilingual Communications from St. Thomas University. In 2012 she received a Master's Degree in Business Administration (MBA) from Florida International University.

Organizations
She is a member of the Board of Directors for Futuro Program, a non-profit organization that provides educational services to Hispanic high school students and also for the organization "Amigos For Kids".  She is a member of the Steering Committee of the Florida International University - School of Journalism & Mass Communication.

Personal life
Silva was born in Lima, Peru where she lived the first ten years of her life. She is fluent in both English and Spanish.  She resides in Miami.

References

External links
 Pamela Silva, un nuevo rostro en Univisión
 Univision Taps Pamela Silva  as Co-Anchor of 'Primer Impacto'
 Communications Week honors students, Earth Day

Living people
National Football League cheerleaders
People from Lima
Peruvian emigrants to the United States
People from Miami
Emmy Award winners
American women journalists
American cheerleaders
1981 births
21st-century American women